Móra Ferenc Secondary School (in Hungarian: Móra Ferenc Gimnázium) is a secondary grammar school in Kiskunfélegyháza, Hungary. It is the oldest secondary school in Kiskunfélegyháza.

Notable alumni 

 Ferenc Móra writer
 Piroska Szántó painter
 László Holló painter
 Lajos Holló politician

References

External links
 Móra Ferenc Gimnázium (Hungarian)

Gymnasiums in Hungary